The 1940 West Virginia gubernatorial election took place on November 5, 1940, to elect the governor of West Virginia.

Results

References

1940
gubernatorial
West Virginia
November 1940 events